The following table indicates the party of elected officials in the U.S. state of Delaware:
Governor
Lieutenant Governor
Attorney General
State Treasurer
State Auditor
State Insurance Commissioner

The table also indicates the historical party composition in the:
State Senate
State House of Representatives
State delegation to the U.S. Senate
State delegation to the U.S. House of Representatives

For years in which a presidential election was held, the table indicates which party's nominees received the state's electoral votes.

1777–1900

1901–present

References

See also
Law and government in Delaware
Politics of Delaware
Elections in Delaware

Politics of Delaware
Government of Delaware
Delaware